Rudy Sandoval may refer to:

 Rodolfo Sandoval (baseball) (born 1937)
 Marcela Sandoval, full name Rudy Marcela Sandoval Afanador (born 1996), Colombian gymnast